The Stark Munro Letters is a novel by British author Sir Arthur Conan Doyle first published in 1895 by Longmans, Green & Co. in London, England.

Synopsis
As an epistolary novel it takes the form of twelve long letters written by J. Stark Munro between March 1881 and November 1884 and sent to his friend Herbert Swanborough of Lowell, Massachusetts. Stark Munro is a recent graduate from medical school, and the letters, in part, detail his attempts to create a medical practice in partnership with the brilliant but unorthodox James Cullingworth--a narrative based on Doyle's experiences in Plymouth, before he set up his own practice in Southsea, Portsmouth in 1882.

Mention in James Joyce's Ulysses
The Stark-Munro Letters by A. Conan Doyle is mentioned in the "Ithaca" chapter of Ulysses.

References

External links

 
 

 

1895 British novels
Novels by Arthur Conan Doyle
Fiction set in 1881
Fiction set in 1884
Novels set in the 1880s
Epistolary novels